Yiwu High School (YWHS), is a senior high school in Yiwu. It was founded in 1927.

External links
 Yiwu HighSchool Home Page  

1927 establishments in China
Educational institutions established in 1927
High schools in Zhejiang
Yiwu